Notes on "Camp" is an essay by Susan Sontag.

Background
It was first published as an essay in 1964, and was her first contribution to the Partisan Review. The essay attracted interest in Sontag. It was republished in 1966 in Sontag's debut collection of essays, Against Interpretation. The essay considers meanings and connotations of the word "camp".

The 2019 haute couture art exhibit Camp: Notes on Fashion, presented by the Anna Wintour Costume Center at New York City's Metropolitan Museum of Art, was built around Sontag's essay by Andrew Bolton, the Wendy Yu Curator in Charge of the Costume Institute.

Synopsis
Christopher Isherwood is mentioned in Sontag's essay: "Apart from a lazy two-page sketch in Christopher Isherwood's novel The World in the Evening (1954), [camp] has hardly broken into print." In Isherwood's novel two characters are discussing the meaning of camp, both High and Low. Stephen Monk, the protagonist, says:

You thought it meant a swishy little boy with peroxided hair, dressed in a picture hat and a feather boa, pretending to be Marlene Dietrich?  Yes, in queer circles they call that camping.  … You can call [it] Low Camp…High Camp is the whole emotional basis for ballet, for example, and of course of baroque art … High Camp always has an underlying seriousness.  You can't camp about something you don't take seriously.  You're not making fun of it, you're making fun out of it.  You're expressing what’s basically serious to you in terms of fun and artifice and elegance.  Baroque art is basically camp about religion.  The ballet is camp about love …

Then examples are given:  Mozart, El Greco and Dostoevsky are camp; Beethoven, Flaubert and Rembrandt are not.

See also
Kitsch
Gay culture
Low culture
Cinephilia
High culture

References

External links
Full text of ‘Notes on “Camp”’

1964 essays
Essays in literary criticism
American essays
Aesthetics literature
Works originally published in Partisan Review
Works by Susan Sontag
Essays about culture